The Diocese of St Andrews, Dunkeld and Dunblane is one of the seven dioceses of the Scottish Episcopal Church, part of the Anglican Communion. It is centred on St Ninian's Cathedral in Perth, and covers Fife, Perthshire, Kinross-shire, Clackmannanshire, and eastern and central Stirlingshire (western Stirlingshire is in the Diocese of Glasgow and Galloway). The current Bishop of St Andrews, Dunkeld and Dunblane is the Right Reverend Ian Paton.

The diocese continues the titles of three ancient Scottish dioceses. The Diocese of St Andrews was founded in 906 and was raised to an archdiocese in 1465. Throughout the Scottish Reformation the diocese continued under the auspices of moderate, Episcopalian reformers. From 1704 until 1726, the archbishopric was vacant, until it was recreated as the Diocese of Fife. In 1842, the diocese, no longer an archdiocese, was moved back to St Andrews and united with the Diocese of Dunkeld and Dunblane.

The Diocese of Dunkeld is thought to have begun in the 9th century, but the first reliable date is that of the consecration of Cormac as bishop in 1114. The line of bishops continued with only a few vacancies until, in 1842, the diocese was united with St Andrews. In 1878, the Roman Catholic Church revived the Diocese of Dunkeld as part of its structures in Scotland.

The Diocese of Dunblane was founded in 1162. Its line of bishops continued with a few vacancies until it was united with the Diocese of Dunkeld in 1776.

Area and population 
The diocese covers the historic counties of Perthshire (population 155,000), the Forfar and Kirriemuir areas of Angus (population 30,500), Clackmannanshire (population 51,000), Kinross-shire (population 11,500), Fife (population 365,000), and central Stirlingshire (population 90,000).

This total population of approximately 703,000 gives the diocese a ratio of one priest to every 37,000 inhabitants and one church to every 14,600 inhabitants.

List of churches 
The diocese currently has 47 churches and 24 stipendiary clergy.

Last fully updated 28 October 2021.

Closed churches

See also
Roman Catholic Archdiocese of St Andrews and Edinburgh
Roman Catholic Diocese of Dunkeld

References

Saint Andrew's
Christianity in Perth and Kinross
1842 establishments in Scotland